The 1992 Men's Champions Trophy was the 14th edition of the Hockey Champions Trophy men's field hockey tournament. It took place from February 20–28, 1992 in the National Hockey Stadium in Karachi, Pakistan.

Results

Pool

Classification

Fifth and sixth place

Third and fourth place

Final

Final standings

References

External links
Official FIH website

C
H
Champions Trophy (field hockey)
1992